The Salvadoran Independent Party (abbreviated PAIS) is a Salvadoran political party.

History 

The Salvadoran Independent Party was established by Roy García in October 2021 after he left Nuevas Ideas. The party was registered with the Supreme Electoral Court (TSE) in November 2021. He was later suspended by the party. García was a potential candidate for president in the 2024 general election. Another potential presidential candidate, Gerardo Awad, was suspended by the party in July 2022.

References 

Political parties in El Salvador
Political parties established in 2013
2013 establishments in El Salvador